The Chongqing Grand Theatre (or Theater) is a performing arts venue in central Chongqing, People's Republic of China, located overlooking the Yangtze River. The 64-metre six-storey building was constructed from 2005 until 2009. Hassell, a design company, took part in a competition to decide how the building was constructed and laid out. The building contains two concert halls.

Coliseum 
The coliseum is a horseshoe shaped auditorium which can accommodate 1826 people, including an 88-member orchestra pit. The coliseum is intended for large-scale opera, ballet, symphony, ballet, musicals and other performances.

Theatre 
The audience hall is two floors and can accommodate 938 people, plus 65 in the orchestra pit.  It is designed for small and medium-sized dance, opera, drama, vocal, small orchestra, chamber music, folk music and other performances.

Performances 
Since being built the Chongqing Grand Theater has hosted many performances:
Shen Wenyu in August 2011;
José Carreras on November 1, 2011;
Quartet San Francisco on January 11, 2012;
Shengyan on February 14, 2012;
Phil Chang on March 12, 2012;
Winnie Hsin Tour concert on May 13, 2012;
Michael Wong on July 14, 2012;
Chang Cheng-yue on August 29, 2012;
Wangfan on September 9, 2012;
Richard Clayderman on December 14, 2012;
Bianca Wu on December 15, 2012;
Qi Qin on December 24, 2012;
Flymen on January 22, 2013;
Wu shuang in March 2013;
Flautando Kolin Recorder Quartet on March 23, 2013;
Johnny Jiang on May 28, 2013;
Li Yugang on July 21, 2013.

The design is different from what Hassel envisioned; a mix between a space center and a sailing ship.

References

Jiangbei District, Chongqing
2009 establishments in China
Music venues completed in 2009
Tourist attractions in Chongqing
Buildings and structures in Chongqing
Culture in Chongqing
Yangtze River
Theatres in Chongqing